Nzamaligué is a village in Estuaire Province in northwestern Gabon . It lies along the L106 road (Nzamlique-Donguila road), 16 kilometres by road northeast of Donguila and 12.2 kilometres south of Nkam.

Notable people
Casimir Oyé Mba (1942-2021)

References

Populated places in Estuaire Province
Komo-Mondah Department